Shaydabad (also Romanized as Shaydābād) is a village in Jolgeh Rural District, in the Central District of Golpayegan County, Isfahan Province, Iran. At the 2006 census, its population was 297, in 99 families.

References 

Populated places in Golpayegan County